Weyerhaeuser Steamship Company was a was a and cargo Liner company founded in Tacoma, Washington.  Weyerhaeuser Steamship Company was founded by Weyerhaeuser Company in 1933. Weyerhaeuser is one of the largest lumber and paper companies in the United States. First called the Weyerhaeuser Timber Company which started with ships for towing logs in the Northwestern United States. Weyerhaeuser started Weyerhaeuser Timber Company with a ship he acquired in 1892. The log towing ship was a 140-foot sternwheeler built for the partnership, Weyerhaeuser and Denkman Company. In 1923 Weyerhaeuser added to ocean lumber cargo ship the SS Pomona and the SS Hanley. The two ships took lumber to the East Coast. In 1933 F. Weyerhaeuser starts the Weyerhaeuser Steamship Company and moves the headquarters to Newark, New Jersey.   At the outbreak of World War II the US government orders the four Weyerhaeuser to take supplies to the British army in Egypt. The next year the other four company's ships are requisitioned by the War Shipping Administration. During World War II the Weyerhaeuser Steamship Company was active in charter shipping  with the Maritime Commission and War Shipping Administration. During wartime, the Weyerhaeuser Steamship Company operated Victory ships and Liberty shipss. The ship was run by its crew and the US Navy supplied United States Navy Armed Guards to man the deck guns and radio. The most common armament mounted on these merchant ships were the MK II 20mm Oerlikon autocannon and the 3"/50, 4"/50, and 5"/38 deck guns.   In 1942 the SS Potlatch and the SS Heffron were sunk by German  U-boats torpedoes. After the war, Weyerhaeuser Steamship Company purchased four Liberty ships for intercoastal shipping service.  In 1950 Weyerhaeuser Steamship Company purchases the Pacific Coast Direct Line and moves its headquarter from Newark to San Francisco.  In 1962 the Weyerhaeuser Line is started and Weyerhaeuser Steamship becomes a division of Weyerhaeuser Company.

In 1962 many trees fell due to the Columbus Day Storm of 1962, Weyerhaeuser Steamship Company charter ships to take the surplus of lumber Japan. Ships are chartered to carry finished forest products to Australia (the first Weyerhaeuser transportation of finished products to a foreign market). In 1964 Weyerhaeuser Steamship Company expands with service to Australia, In 1967 charter "M" ships from Hoegh take lumber products to Europe. Weyerhaeuser Line headquarters moves to Tacoma in 1966. By 1969 all the post Liberty ships purchased by Weyerhaeuser Steamship Company were sold and some shipping moved to charter ships.

In 1975 Weyerhaeuser contracted with Leif Höegh & Co to have built six new second generation of Container  "M" ships with open-hatch and gantry-crane transport lumber to Europe, ships are delivered in 1977. Weyerhaeuser added two new "J" ships to transport newsprint from the new mill that is joint venture between Weyerhaeuser and Jujo of Tokyo  at Longview, British Columbia.

In 1982 Weyerhaeuser Steamship Company's name is changed to Westwood Shipping Lines, the Lines also enters in to a joint venture with Hoegh, with transpacific container shipping.  Weyerhaeuser sells its Westwood Shipping Lines to J-WeSco for $53 million. J-WesCo, is a subsidiary of Sumitomo Warehouse in Japan. At the time of the sale Westwood Shipping Lines had a fleet of seven ships, with ports of call in  North America, Japan, Korea and China. Westwood Shipping Lines main cargo to Aisa is newsprint, lumber, pulp and agricultural products. Returning to the US the fleet transports automotive parts, motorcycles, parts for Boeing airplanes, outboard engines, tires and heavy cargo like generators.

Ships
 
Pomona
Hanley
Hanley
Hegira
Heffron sank by mined on July 5, 1942, off Ireland  
Klamath
Winona, sank by U-boat October 16, 1942 off Trinidad
Pennsylvania sank as  SS Tanar in 1959   
Potlatch sank in 1942 by Uboat off Virgin Islands 
F. E. Weyerhaeuser (was James Kenny, Liberty ship) (collision with Pacific on September 8, 1955)
John Weyerhaeuser (was Edward Haines, Liberty ship)
Horace Irvine (was Louis Bamberger, Liberty ship)
George S. Long (was Dexter W. Fellows, Liberty ship)
W. H. Peabody (was Mary Pickersgill, Liberty ship)
C. R. Moser (was George E. Waldo, Liberty ship)
Y. L. McCormick
Nashua Victory  (chartered in the 1960s)
Frontenac Victory (chartered in the 1960s)
Columbia Victory(chartered in the 1960s)
Central Victory (chartered in the 1960s)
Tugboats built by RivTow  Marine from 1979 to 1990 .

Tug B532
Tug B533
Tug B 534
Tug B535m
Tug MB317 
Tug B141
Tug B142
Tug B143
Tug MB318
Tug B210
Tug B213
Tug B214
Tug B 256
Tug B 257
Tug B 258
Tug B 228
Tug B 212
Tug B 213
Tug B 214
Tug B 225
Tug B 226
Tug MB319
Tug B540
Tug B552
Tug B541
Tug M.B. 310
Tug Sandra May
Tug B144
Tug M.B. 307
Tug B551
Tug B145
Tug B147
Tug B148
Tug MB313
Tug B545
Tug B546
Tug B544
Tug B547
Tug B548
Tug Kelsey Don
Tug Northern Falcon
Tug MB037
Tug Burrard Cleaner No. 9
Tug  	M.B. 303
Tugboats by Benson Bros. Shipbuilding in 1969 
Tug B211
Tug B215
Tug B216
Tug B217
Tug B219 
Tugboats by Alberni Engineering in 1989 - 1990
Tug B138
Tug B138
Tug B138
Tug B138
Speed boat	B550
sidewinder tug	B551
sidewinder tug	B552
sidewinder tug	B553

Chartered from Leif Hoegh
Leif Hoegh charter from 1967 to 1981 44,000-ton, 660-ft-long built by Mitsubishi Heavy Industries, open-hatch general cargo ships:
Hoegh Mallard
Hoegh Musketeer
Hoegh Merchant
Hoegh Marlin
Hoegh Mawscot
Hoegh Merit

Westwood Shipping Lines ships
Weyerhaeuser's Westwood Shipping Lines ships:
Westwood are 656-foot “con-bulker” can carry both bulk products and containers. Can displaces 59,531 tons when fully loaded.
Westwood Columbia
Westwood Victoria
Westwood Olympia
Westwood Rainier
Westwood Pomona    (was Kent Loyalist built in 1985, not a con-bulke)

World War II ships

Liberty ships operated under charter during and after World War II:
Barney Kirschbaum
Mary Pickersgill
Mary Walker
Mason L. Weems
Dexter W. Fellows
Coeur d'Alene Victory
SS Fordham Victory
Edgar Allan Poe,  Torpedoed November 8, 1942, did not sink, used as store ship.
Edward B. Haines
Leo J. Duster
Lilian Wald
Louis Bamberger
Abigail S. Duniway
Alexander Graham Bell, Hit mine, repaired
Walt Whitman, damaged repaired
William Dawes sank July 21, 1942 Japanese submarine I11  
George Clement Perkins
George G. Meade, Damaged, repaired 
George L. Baker
George W. Campbell
Joseph G. Cannon, Damaged, repaired  
Joseph J. Kinyoun
James Kerney
Solomon Juneau, Hit by torpedoed off France April 9, 1945, repaired.
William S. Ladd, Sank on Dec. 10, 1944 after Japanese Kamikaze attack in Leyte Harbour, Philippines.
Charles John Seghers
Samuel Gompers Sank Jan. 29, 1943 after torpedoed from Japanese submarine I10 off New Caledonia
John H. Couch 	sank by aerial torpedoed Oct. 11, 1943 
Juan de Fuca Torpedoed and damaged by a Japanese aircraft, repiared
 

Victory ships operated under charter during and after World War II:
Tuskegee Victory
United States Victory
Silverbow Victory
Drew Victory
Berea Victory
Alamo Victory
Fordham Victory
Brainerd Victory
Coeur d’ Alene Victory
Queens Victory

References 

Weyerhaeuser
Transport companies established in 1933
American companies established in 1933
1933 establishments in Washington (state)